Ottoman Serbs were ethnic Serbs who lived in the Ottoman Empire (1453–1922). Ottoman Serbs, who were Serbian Orthodox Christian, belonged to the Rum Millet (millet-i Rûm, "Roman Nation"). Although a separate Serbian millet (Sırp Milleti) was not officially recognized during Ottoman rule, the Serbian Church was the legally confirmed representative organization of the Serbs in the Ottoman Empire.

History

Early modern period
The Serbs had taken an active part in the wars fought in the Balkans against the Ottoman Empire, and also organized uprisings. Because of this, they suffered persecution and their territories were devastated. Major migrations from Serbia into Habsburg territory ensued.

In early 1594, the Serbs in Banat rose up against the Ottomans. The rebels had, in the character of a holy war, carried war flags with the icon of Saint Sava. After suppressing the uprising, the Ottomans publicly incinerated the relics of Saint Sava at the Vračar plateau on April 27, 1595. The incineration of Sava's relics provoked the Serbs, and empowered the Serb liberation movement. From 1596, the center of anti-Ottoman activity in Herzegovina was the Tvrdoš Monastery in Trebinje. An uprising broke out in 1596, but the rebels were defeated at the field of Gacko in 1597, and were forced to capitulate due to the lack of foreign support.

After allied Christian forces had captured Buda from the Ottoman Empire in 1686 during the Great Turkish War, Serbs from Pannonian Plain (present-day Hungary, Slavonia region in present-day Croatia, Bačka and Banat regions in present-day Serbia) joined the troops of the Habsburg Monarchy as separate units known as Serbian Militia. Serbs, as volunteers, massively joined the Austrian side. In 1688, the Habsburg army took Belgrade and entered the territory of present-day Central Serbia. Louis William, Margrave of Baden-Baden called Serbian Patriarch Arsenije III Čarnojević to raise arms against the Turks; the Patriarch accepted and returned to the liberated Peć. As Serbia fell under Habsburg control, Leopold I granted Arsenije nobility and the title of duke. After the ensuing Ottoman victory, a large migration of Serbs to Habsburg lands was undertaken by Patriarch Arsenije III. The large community of Serbs concentrated in Banat, southern Hungary and the Military Frontier included merchants and craftsmen in the cities, but mainly refugees that were peasants. Serbia remained under Ottoman control until the early 19th century, with the eruption of the Serbian Revolution in 1804.

1900s
The Serb Democratic League was an Ottoman Serb political organisation established on August 13, 1908, at the First Serb Conference (August 10–13), immediately after the Young Turk Revolution. It included the Serb elite of Old Raška, Kosovo and Metohija, and Vardar Macedonia and Aegean Macedonia.

Serbian Patriarchate of Peć

The Serbian Orthodox Church was re-established in 1557, as the Serbian Patriarchate of Peć. The Patriarchate was abolished in 1766.

Nationality status
In 1826, an addendum to the Akkerman Convention mentioned the Serb Millet. Since given autonomy in 1830, the Principality of Serbia urged the Ottoman government to recognize the Serb nation outside the principality, in Ottoman territories.

In 1906, the Ottoman government recognized the Serb Millet in Macedonia. This decision was made independently from the Serbian government.

Notable people
 
After the Ottoman conquest of the Balkans, the Ottoman Empire acquired a significant Serb community. Among notable people in the Ottoman government of fully or partial Serb ancestry were several viziers and sultans (Suleiman II and Osman III).

Serb community
Marko Mrnjavčević, Serbian provincial lord, Ottoman vassal
Mihailo Anđelović, Serbian Despotate
Stanislav Sočivica (1715–1777), Serbian rebel leader, active in Bosnia and Herzegovina and Montenegro.
For Serbian Revolutionaries, see this list.

Ottoman government
Sokollu Mehmed Pasha, Ottoman Grand Vizier from 1565 to 1579
Aşub Sultan, originally Katarina, consort of Sultan Ibrahim I and mother of Sultan Suleiman II.
Şehsuvar Sultan, originally Maria, consort of Sultan Mustafa II (r. 1695–1703) and mother of Sultan Osman III (r. 1754–1757).
Olivera Despina, daughter of Prince Lazar, consort of Sultan Bayezid I.
Veli Mahmud Pasha, Grand Vizier 1456–68 and 1472–74. Serbian-Byzantine from Novo Brdo.
Zagan Pasha, Ottoman Grand Vizier from 1453 to 1456
Deli Husrev Pasha, Ottoman statesman and second vizier
Hadım Ali Pasha, Ottoman Grand Vizier from 1501 to 1503 and 1506 to 1511
Lala Mustafa Pasha,  Ottoman Grand Vizier in 1580
Semiz Ali Pasha, Ottoman Grand Vizier from 1561 to 1565
Sokolluzade Lala Mehmed Pasha, Ottoman Grand Vizier from 1604 to 1606
Boşnak Derviş Mehmed Pasha, Ottoman Grand Vizier during 1606
Nevesinli Salih Pasha, Ottoman Grand Vizier from 1645 to 1647
Kara Musa Pasha, Ottoman Grand Vizier during 1647
Sarı Süleyman Pasha, Ottoman Grand Vizier from 1685 to 1687
Daltaban Mustafa Pasha, Ottoman Grand Vizier from 1702 to 1703
Damat Melek Mehmed Pasha, Ottoman Grand Vizier from 1792 to 1794
Ivaz Mehmed Pasha, Ottoman Grand Vizier from 1739 to 1740
Yavuz Ali Pasha, Ottoman Governor of Egypt from 1601 to 1603
Meylişah Hatun, Consort to Sultan Osman II
George Berovich, Governor-General  of Crete and Prince of Samos.
Gedik Ahmed Pasha, Grand Vizier 1474–77. Serbian from Vranje.
Omar Pasha (1806–1871), general, convert
Mara Branković, wife of Murad II, very influential in imperial affairs, ambassador to Venice
Osman Aga of Temesvar (1670–1725), Ottoman commander
Skenderbeg Crnojević
George Berovich
Aganlija
Kučuk-Alija
Sali Aga
Sinan-paša Sijerčić, Ottoman Bosnian general. Bosnian Serb origin.
Malkoçoğlu family, one of four leading akinci families. Serbian origin.

See also

Ottoman Greeks

References

Sources

Aslantaş, S. (2010). SIRP MİLLETİNİN İNŞASINDA BİR ARAÇ OLARAK TARİH. In Perspectives on Ottoman studies: papers from the 18th Symposium of the International Committee of Pre-Ottoman and Ottoman Studies (CIEPO) at the University of Zagreb 2008 (Vol. 1, p. 97). LIT Verlag Münster. 
 
 
 
 
 
 

 
 

 
 
 Stojančević, Vladimir. Južnoslovenski narodi u Osmanskom carstvu od Jedrenskog mira 1829. do Pariskog kongresa 1856. godine. Izdavačko-štamparsko preduzeće PTT, 1971.